The 2013 Chevrolet Silverado 250 was a NASCAR Camping World Truck Series race held on September 1, 2013. Contested over 64 laps, the race was the inaugural running of the Chevrolet Silverado 250 at Canadian Tire Motorsport Park in Bowmanville, Ontario, and the fourteenth of the 2013 NASCAR Camping World Truck Series season. The race was the first Truck race in Canada and the first road course race since 2000.

James Buescher of Turner Scott Motorsports won the pole position, while Hendrick Motorsports' Chase Elliott won the race in controversial fashion, when he turned Ty Dillon in the final turn on the last lap. Afterwards, Mike Skeen and Max Papis were involved in a post-race incident where Skeen's girlfriend slapped Papis for contact on the final lap.

Background

On November 28, 2012, it was announced that the track would host a Truck Series race on Labour Day weekend, the second addition to the 2013 schedule after the Mudsummer Classic at Eldora Speedway. The Chevrolet Silverado 250 marked the first Truck race in Canada and the first road course race since 2000 at Watkins Glen International.

The driver age restriction was reduced from 18 to 16 years for tracks like CTMP. Among the drivers entered for the event included Mike Skeen, who won the previous four Pirelli World Challenge GT Series races at the track, along with Canadian Tire drivers Martin Roy and Alex Guenette. To practice for the event, Jeb Burton, Ty Dillon and James Buescher also ran the CTS race at the track.

Entering the race, Matt Crafton led the points standings with 498 points, followed by Buescher and Burton, who had 449 and 445 points, respectively. Dillon and Timothy Peters comprised the top five with 440 and 426 points each, while the top ten featured Miguel Paludo (422), Ryan Blaney (421), Brendan Gaughan (418), Johnny Sauter (409) and Joey Coulter (399).

Qualifying
Four practice sessions were held on August 30; the first two were dominated by Mike Skeen, while the third and fourth were led by Chase Elliott. 30 drivers entered the race, with qualifying taking place on August 31. Skeen, Elliott, Chris Lafferty and Jennifer Jo Cobb were required to qualify on time. Skeen, Elliott, Miguel Paludo and Ty Dillon rounded out the top five, while the top ten included Max Papis, Chad Hackenbracht, Darrell Wallace Jr. and Brendan Gaughan. The top-qualifying Canadian driver was Alex Guenette, who qualified 14th. Bryan Silas was ordered to the rear of the field due to unapproved adjustments.

Qualifying results

Race
Pole-sitter James Buescher led for the first two laps before Chase Elliott took the lead, leading for 23 laps until lap 26, when Ryan Blaney claimed it, leading for two laps until it was relinquished to Ty Dillon. Germán Quiroga and Miguel Paludo also led laps, the former leading laps 34–36 and the latter leading 37–46; Dillon took the lead again on lap 48. Prior to lap 48, three cautions were waved: on lap 8 for Max Gresham stalling in turn 5, on lap 33 for Jennifer Jo Cobb's stall in turn 2, and on lap 47 with Alex Guenette also stalling in turn 4. Dillon continued to lead for 17 laps from lap 47 to 63, and on lap 58, Johnny Sauter stalled in turn 6. In the final turn of the last lap, Elliott turned Dillon into the tire barrier, which brought out the caution, to claim his first career NASCAR win in his sixth series start, becoming the youngest Truck Series race winner at 17 years, 9 months, 4 days. Followed by Elliott was Chad Hackenbracht, Paludo, Darrell Wallace Jr., Ron Hornaday Jr., Max Papis, Ross Chastain, Timothy Peters, Buescher and Matt Crafton. Derek White (rear hub), Guenette (oil line), Brennan Newberry (transmission), Sauter (gas line), Carl Long (brakes) and Chris Lafferty (clutch) failed to finish the race.

The race featured seven lead changes, six different leaders and five caution periods.

Post-race
In victory lane, Elliott stated about the wreck:

Meanwhile, Dillon, who finished 17th, said, "You've got to show respect. I hope he runs Iowa (next week). He won't finish the race." The following week at the Fan Appreciation 200, Elliott crashed on lap 35, finishing 31st.

Also on the final lap, Max Papis and Mike Skeen battled for second when they made contact in the final turn, and after the race, Skeen's pit crew, along with Skeen's girlfriend, attacked Papis. Papis later accused Skeen's girlfriend of dislocating his jaw, saying, "This crazy lady comes shouting at me, and I had no idea, didn't even understand her, she just started shouting. And all the sudden, she took a full hand – and she slapped me so hard. I'm not kidding. My jaw got dislocated and my left ear is still ringing, big time." Papis later redacted his statements, citing language barriers. On September 4, 2013, NASCAR suspended Skeen's girlfriend indefinitely from all NASCAR events, while crew chief Bryan Berry was fined $2,500.

Another post-race altercation involved Germán Quiroga and crews for James Buescher after the two and Ron Hornaday tangled in the final laps. Quiroga was spun out on the final lap and tried to confront Buescher in the pits before being restrained by NASCAR officials.

Results

Standings after the race

References

Chevrolet Silverado 250
Chevrolet Silverado 250
NASCAR races at Canadian Tire Motorsport Park